This is a list of airports in Azerbaijan, grouped by type and sorted by location.

Azerbaijan, formally the Republic of Azerbaijan, is a country in the Caucasus region of Eurasia. It is bounded by the Caspian Sea to the east, Russia to the north, Georgia to the northwest, Armenia to the west, and Iran to the south. The exclave of Nakhchivan is bounded by Armenia to the north and east, Iran to the south and west, while having a short borderline with Turkey to the northwest. The country's capital city is Baku. The de facto independent Republic of Artsakh is a break away state that is in the south west which is de jure part of Azerbaijan. Air transportation in Azerbaijan is regulated by the Ministry of Transportation of Azerbaijan Republic.

A$40 million project to lengthen the main runway at Ganja Airport has been completed, allowing the first international direct connections to the city. Similar projects are underway at Lenkoran and Zaqatala and due for completion in 2007.



Airports 

Names shown in bold indicate the airport has scheduled passenger service on commercial airlines.

See also 

 Transport in Azerbaijan
 Azerbaijan Air Force
 List of airports by ICAO code: U#UB - Azerbaijan
 List of airports in Nagorno-Karabakh
 Wikipedia: WikiProject Aviation/Airline destination lists: Asia#Azerbaijan

References

External links 
 Survey of Russian Airfields, Edition 5 – 26 November 2005
 
 
  – includes IATA codes
  – ICAO codes and coordinates
  – IATA codes, ICAO codes and coordinates

 
Azerbaijan
Airports in Azerbaijan
Airports
Azerbaijan
Azerbaijan